is a Japanese manga series written and illustrated by Kei Kusunoki. The manga has been adapted into a four-episode original video animation (OVA). Both the manga and anime were distributed in North America by Viz Media, though only two volumes of the manga were released. On July 11, 2013, plans for a follow-up manga were announced. Unlike its predecessor, takes place in the Sengoku era, and features an entirely different lead character.

Synopsis
Ogre Slayer is about a young man who hunts ogres. The young man was born of an ogre's corpse, like the oni born of human's body, making him pure ogre blood. Though he was born like an ogre, he has the appearance of a human. Instead of being born with horns like traditional Japanese ogres, he was born with a sword. The young man does not have a name, but his sword is called Onikirimaru, the Ogre Slayer.

Characters
 Ogre Slayer  (English) Takeshi Kusao (Japanese)

Volume list

References

External links
 

1991 manga
1994 anime OVAs
Horror anime and manga
Shogakukan manga
Shōnen manga
Viz Media anime
Viz Media manga